Mikhail Leonidovich Bogdanov (born 2 March 1952) is a Russian diplomat. He is Deputy Minister of Foreign Affairs of Russia and Special Representative of the President of Russia for the Middle East. He is also Deputy Chairman of the Imperial Orthodox Palestine Society.

Biography
Mikhail Bogdanov graduated from the Moscow State Institute of International Relations (MGIMO) in 1974.

Mikhail Bogdanov worked in the Soviet embassies in South Yemen from 1974 to 1977, Lebanon from 1977 to 1980, Syria from 1983 to 1989, and Syria again from 1991 to 1994. He was Russian ambassador to Israel from 1997 to 2002, and ambassador to Egypt, and was concurrently Representative to the Arab League from 2005 to 2011. A 1994 leaked cable written by Bogdanov and published by WikiLeaks revealed that the Russian diplomacy was completely clueless on the aftermath of the deadly accident of Bassel al-Assad.

Mikhail Bogdanov was appointed director of the Department of the Middle East and North Africa at the Ministry of Foreign Affairs from 2002 to 2005. He served as Deputy Foreign Minister since June 2011, Special Presidential envoy for the Middle East since 23 January 2012, and Special Presidential envoy for the Middle East and Africa since October 2014. In a November 2015 news conference, Mikhail Bogdanov declared that Russia did not consider Hezbollah a terrorist organization, since it had not committed terrorist acts on Russian soil, and maintained a legitimate presence in the Lebanese government.

During the Syrian Civil War, he acted as an intermediary between the Syrian government and the Syrian opposition based in Turkey.

He is married and has a son.

Awards
  Order of Friendship
  Order of Honour

References

1952 births
Living people
Ambassador Extraordinary and Plenipotentiary (Russian Federation)
Ambassadors of Russia to Israel
Ambassadors of Russia to Egypt
Moscow State Institute of International Relations alumni
Diplomats from Moscow
Recipients of the Order of Honour (Russia)